Albert Azaryan (born 11 February 1929) is a former Soviet Armenian artistic gymnast who competed internationally representing the Soviet Union. He is the 1956 and 1960 Olympic Champion on the still rings. Azaryan is the first gymnast to become an Olympic Champion in rings twice, a feat that Akinori Nakayama would accomplish twelve years later and that no one else has matched since. He is the first person to do one of the rings most famous variations of the Iron Cross called the Azaryan Cross (not to be confused with the Azarian Roll to Cross), which incorporates a quarter turn to the side.

Early life
Azaryan was born on 11 February 1929 in Gharakilisa, Transcaucasian SFSR. His father died when he was 14. Azaryan had to leave school and work as an ironsmith to support his family. When he was 17, a group of elite Armenian gymnasts gave an exhibition in his town. Afterwards, some teenage boys (including Azaryan) went on the apparatus and tried to perform the skills they had just seen. The gymnasts were so impressed with Albert that he was invited to move to Yerevan to train with them. After three years, he became the Armenian champion on rings and earned a Master of Sport ranking.

Career

Azaryan competed at the USSR Championship in 1953. The judges were very strict and Azaryan felt nervous. When it was his turn, Azaryan pulled himself up on the rings and performed his own special technique. The judges did not give him an assessment at the time but he was invited to the next championship. It would later turn out that the judges had rated Azaryan's innovation as something "unprecedented." This technique Azaryan had performed would later become known as the "Azaryan Cross."

Azaryan became a member of the Soviet national men's gymnastics team and competed with them at the 1954 World Artistic Gymnastics Championships. Alongside Azaryan on the team was friend and fellow Armenian Hrant Shahinyan. The Soviet team won gold in the team competition and Azaryan himself won the gold medal in rings. Azaryan joined the rest of the Soviet team at the 1955 European Men's Artistic Gymnastics Championships one year later. Azaryan became the European Champion in rings. He came behind stablemate Boris Shakhlin in most of the competitions, including coming second to Shakhlin on the high bars and individual all-around. He also had a three-way tie with Shaklin and Helmut Bantz on the parallel bars, resulting in three gold medalists.

Azaryan competed at the 1956 Summer Olympics in every men's gymnastics competition. He came in seventh place in the individual all-around. Both Azaryan and the Soviet team won the gold medal in the team all-around. He also came in fifth in the parallel bars and eighth in the horizontal bar. When it came time for the still rings, Azaryan won the gold medal and became the Olympic Champion in rings. Two years later came the 1958 World Artistic Gymnastics Championships. Azaryan and the Soviet team defended their World Championship on the team all-around and Azaryan himself defended his own World Championship on the rings, winning gold medals for both. He also won a silver medal on the horizontal bar.

In his final Olympic participation, Azaryan competed at the 1960 Summer Olympics. The Soviet team was unable to retain their Olympic title in the team all-around, coming in second to the Japanese team. Azaryan, however, won the Olympic gold medal in the still rings for a second time and made history as the first Olympian to become an Olympic Champion in the rings twice. This feat has only been matched once ever since, by Akinori Nakayama twelve years later. Azaryan retired from gymnastics shortly afterward.

Azaryan was the flag bearer for Armenia at the 2004 Summer Olympics and 2008 Summer Olympics and is the third and fourth Olympian to bear the flag of Armenia at the Summer Olympics. He also became the first flag bearer to bear the flag of Armenia twice. Azaryan was originally intended to also bear the Armenian flag at the 2012 Summer Olympics, but the decision was reversed due to his age. Azaryan served as President of the Armenian Gymnastics Federation from 1998 to 2021.

Personal life
Azaryan has two daughters and one son with his wife. Neither of his daughters followed in his footsteps, but his son, Eduard Azaryan, also became an international gymnast. Albert was the coach of Eduard throughout his career. Eduard was a 1980 Olympian, where he competed in every event and won a gold medal in the men's artistic team all-around.

Azaryan has received congratulations from late Armenian Prime Minister Andranik Margaryan on his 70th birthday, former Armenian President Robert Kocharyan on his 75th birthday and former Armenian President Serzh Sargsyan on his 80th birthday. In honor of Azaryan, a stamp was printed of him, among other Armenian Olympic Champions, in Armenia in 2009.

An artistic gymnastics tournament, the Albert Azaryan Cup, is named after Azaryan and hosted in Yerevan, Armenia. Azaryan was voted the top Armenian athlete of the 20th century by journalists from the Armenian Sport Journalists Federation.

See also

List of multiple Olympic gold medalists
List of multiple Olympic gold medalists at a single Games
List of multiple Olympic medalists

References

External links
 
 
 
 

1929 births
Living people
People from Vanadzor
Soviet Armenians
Soviet male artistic gymnasts
Armenian male artistic gymnasts
Olympic gymnasts of the Soviet Union
Gymnasts at the 1956 Summer Olympics
Gymnasts at the 1960 Summer Olympics
Olympic gold medalists for the Soviet Union
Olympic silver medalists for the Soviet Union
Olympic medalists in gymnastics
Honoured Masters of Sport of the USSR
Recipients of the Order of the Red Banner of Labour
Medalists at the 1960 Summer Olympics
Medalists at the 1956 Summer Olympics
Medalists at the World Artistic Gymnastics Championships
Spartak athletes
Ethnic Armenian sportspeople
European champions in gymnastics